Highbury Vale is an area located in the city of Nottingham, and is located in the Bulwell Forest ward (which includes Rise Park and the western area of Top Valley). Surrounding areas include Bulwell towards the North, Bestwood to the east, Hempshill Vale to the west and Cinderhill and Basford towards the south. Highbury Vale and Hempshill Vale are classed as a part of Bulwell. At the 2001 census, the area had a population of 4,530.

Facilities
Most facilities in Highbury Vale are located on Highbury Road. Facilities include several takeaways, a Ladbrokes, a McColls's Convenience Store as well as a pharmacy, a British Red Cross charity shop and other convenience stores.

Highbury Vale also has a sports centre located off Kemmel Road as well as a health centre known as Highbury Hospital. Schools in the area include the Heathfield Primary and Nursery School of Kersall Drive, Our Lady of Perpetual Succour Catholic Primary School next to Piccadilly as well as the Cantrell Primary and Nursery School.

Demography
According to the data of the 2001 Census, the area has a population of 4,530, and a majority of the population are aged 25–44, who make up 32.8% of the population.

The census also shows that 87.0% of the population is White British, as well as 1.5% being White Irish and 1.1% being classed as Other White. 3.8% of the population is Mixed Race, 1.8% is Asian or Asian British, 4.5% is Black or Black British as well as 0.2% of the population being Chinese and other ethnic groups also making 0.2% of the population.

Religion
The 2001 Census shows that 61.3% are Christian as well as 27.5% being Atheist. 1.1% of the population are Muslim, Hinduism and Sikhism each score 0.4%, 0.1% of the population are Buddhist and other religions make up 0.3% of the population as well as another 9.0% who did not state their religion.

Transport

Tram
Highbury Vale has two different main platforms for Line 1 and Line 2, as they both separate after stopping at the preceding station (David Lane). Next to the Hucknall Line platform is the railway line for trains that travel from Nottingham to Worksop. The nearest railway station to Highbury Vale is located in Bulwell.

Nottingham Express Transit
 1: Toton Lane → Beeston → QMC → NG2 Business Park → Railway Station → Nottingham → The Forest → Wilkinson Street → Highbury Vale → Bulwell → Hucknall

 2: Clifton South → Clifton → Wilford Lane → Railway Station → Nottingham → The Forest → Wilkinson Street → Highbury Vale → Phoenix Park

Bus services
Highbury Vale has a number of frequent bus service ran by Nottingham City Transport as well as a Locallink service ran by Nottingham Community Transport.

Nottingham City Transport
 17: Nottingham → NCN Clarendon College → Hucknall Road → City Hospital → Highbury Vale (St Alban's Road) → Bulwell

 68: Nottingham → Sherwood Rise → Basford → Highbury Vale → Bulwell → Hempshill Vale → Snape Wood

 68A: Nottingham → Sherwood Rise → Basford → Highbury Vale → Bulwell → Hempshill Vale → Blenheim Ind Est → Snape Wood

 69: Nottingham → Sherwood Rise → Basford → Highbury Vale → Bulwell → Snape Wood → Hempshill Vale

 69A: Nottingham → Sherwood Rise → Basford → Highbury Vale → Bulwell → Blenheim Ind Est → Snape Wood

 80: Nottingham → Hyson Green → Radford Road → Highbury Vale → Bulwell

 A1: Basford → Highbury Vale → Bulwell → Snape Wood → Nuthall Road → Trinity/Bluecoat/Nottingham Academy

 N68: Nottingham → Sherwood Rise → Basford → Highbury Vale → Bulwell → Hempshill Vale → Snape Wood → Moor Bridge

Nottingham Community Transport
 L14: Nottingham → Hyson Green → Nottingham Road → City Hospital → Highbury Vale (Brooklyn Road) → Bulwell

References

Areas of Nottingham